The Six Corps was a  74-gun ship of the line of the French Navy. She was funded by a don des vaisseaux donation from the six corps that regrouped the merchants of Paris.

Six Corps was built in Lorient on plan by engineer Groignard. After her completion, she was commissioned under capitaine de aisseau de Choras, and departed Lorient on 13 September 1763, bound for Brest, where she arrived on 27 September.

Six Corps was then put in the reserve fleet, and never took part in any military operation. She was almost completely rebuilt in 1775, ordered on 21 June 1779 to be broken up, and broken up in 1780.

External links 
 Ships of the line

Ships of the line of the French Navy
Ships built in France
1762 ships
Don des vaisseaux